Pili Vesha in (Tulu: ಪಿಲಿ ಏಸ) "Tiger Masque" is a folk dance unique in coastal Karnataka. Pilivēṣa is performed during Navratri to honour the Goddess Durga whose favoured animal is the tiger. Which is called mārnemi. Mangalore Dasara is one of the festivals during which large number of enthusiasts participate in this ritual. It was originated in Udupi District of Karnataka and initially performed during the Krishna Janmashtami/Mosarukudike and Ganesha Chaturthi at Mangalore, Udupi, Moodabidri, Kundapur and many other places in Tulu Nadu.

Typically, young males form troops of five to ten members or more, which will have three to five males painted and costumed to look like tigers, and a band called thaase in Tulu with two or three drummers. This troop is accompanied by the manager of the group. During Navratri, these troops will be roaming the streets of their towns, with the accompanying drum beats of their bands. They stop at homes and businesses or on the roadsides to perform for about ten minutes after which they collect some money from the people who have observed their performance.

The troops perform until the last day of Navratri, and almost all of them form part of the Sharada processions organized by various temples such as Mangaladevi, Gokarnanatheshwara and Venkatramana temple. After the procession is over, performances are stopped and the paint is removed.

Costumes  

While Pili means "tiger" in Tulu, dancers also painted themselves with leopard or cheetah motifs. The costumes may vary depending on the place, costumes used in Mangalore is different compared to Udupi district. Each person will be wearing just a knicker/shorts, which usually has a tiger-skin motif. The rest of his bare body and face is painted with various designs that denote tigers, cheetahs, and leopards. A headgear or mask made of fake fur and sometimes a tail is worn to complete the ensemble. 

The paint causes a burning sensation on the skin. But this is endured by the persons to be part of the celebrations and also to earn some extra money in the holiday season. Originally people used to do this as a part of a religious vow. The paint is kept on the body for a couple of days and repainted or retouched as desired.

Skills 

The skills may vary from person to person and the basic skill required is to know the tiger dance steps which requires one to have enough stamina. Usual skills performed by the artists are Fire breathing, Hand walking, Handstands, gymnastic moves, picking money from mouth by bending backwards and lifting akkimudi (rice tied in straw, weighing 42 kg!) in their teeth and throwing it backwards etc.

In popular culture 
The 2014 Kannada movie Ulidavaru Kandanthe featured Tiger dance where one of the character (actor Achyuth Kumar) belongs to the Pilivesha troop. Also, there is a song titled "Pilivesha Beats" completely dedicated to tiger dance.

The 2021 movie Garuda Gamana Vrishabha Vahana also had a brief history and featured Pili Vesha where the character of Shiva (actor Raj B. Shetty) danced, the tiger dance, with the song "Sojugada sooju mallige"

Gallery

See also
 Puli Kali, a similar dance form in neighbouring Kerala
 Tulunadu Culture
 Mangalore Dasara
 Aati kalenja
 Bhuta Kola

References

Hindu festivals
Festivals in Karnataka
Hinduism in Karnataka
Dakshina Kannada district
Udupi district
Religious festivals in India
Dance festivals in India
Culture of Tulu Nadu
Culture of Mangalore